Pothyne biguttula is a species of beetle in the family Cerambycidae. It was described by Schwarzer in 1929.

References

biguttula
Beetles described in 1929